The Asses Ears are a set of three small islands off northwest Robert Island, forming the north part of Potmess Rocks in English Strait, South Shetland Islands. Presumably known to early sealers, the feature was charted and named descriptively by personnel on Discovery II in 1934–35.

See also
 List of Antarctic and sub-Antarctic islands
 South Shetland Islands

Map
 L.L. Ivanov. Antarctica: Livingston Island and Greenwich, Robert, Snow and Smith Islands. Scale 1:120000 topographic map.  Troyan: Manfred Wörner Foundation, 2009.

References

External links
 SCAR Composite Antarctic Gazetteer

Islands of the South Shetland Islands